Per Magnus Ranstorp (born 13 March 1965 in Hästveda) is a Swedish scholar who has written about Hezbollah, Hamas, Al-Qaeda and other militant Islamic movements. He is the Research Director of the Centre for Asymmetric Threat Studies at the Swedish National Defence College, directing a project on Strategic Terrorist Threats to Europe which focuses on radicalisation and recruitment of salafist-jihadist terrorists across Europe and the convergence between Chemical, Biological, Radioactive and Nuclear Weapons, and Terrorism. Ranstorp graduated from Gustavus Adolphus College in Saint Peter, Minnesota in 1985.

He was previously the Director of Centre for the Study of Terrorism and Political Violence (CSTPV) at the University of St Andrews, Scotland. He is the author of Hizballah in Lebanon as well as several articles and monographs on terrorism and counter-terrorism. He is on the international editorial advisory board of the academic journal Studies in Conflict and Terrorism and on the editorial boards of two newly launched peer-reviewed journals published by Taylor & Francis: Dynamics of Asymmetric Conflict and Critical Studies on Terrorism. In 2003 he was invited to testify before the first hearing of the 9/11 Commission. He was a member of an Advisory Panel on Terrorism in Europe advising the EU counter-terrorism coordinator. In 2005 he was a contributor to the George C. Marshall Center directed project on "Ideological War on Terror: Synthesizing Strategies Worldwide" (funded by the Office of the US Secretary of Defense). In 2006 Ranstorp was invited to join the European Commission Expert Group on Violent Radicalisation, an official advisory body on all matters relating to violent radicalisation and recruitment of extremists within the EU.

During the early stages of the 2011 Norway Attacks, Ranstorp claimed that the attacks could only have been the work of a network of al-Qaeda operatives, something which was later shown to be false, as the attacks were carried out by a lone white supremacist perpetrator. In his manifesto mass-murderer Anders Behring Breivik copied 25 pages verbatim from an ideological text written by Evan Kohlmann and published by an institute led by Magnus Ranstorp.

In March 2017, Ranstorp disparaged the claim made by ISIS magazine Al-Naba that the 2016 Malmö ISIS-related arson was started by "a warrior from the caliphate"; the fire was later shown to have been started by an ISIS operative.

In June 2017 Ranstorp was appointed the leader of a study on jihadi salafist organisations in Sweden by the Swedish Civil Contingencies Agency.

Bibliography
 Mellan salafism och salafistisk jihadism: Påverkan mot och utmaningar för det svenska samhället (en. Between salafism and salafi-jihadism: Counter-measures and challenges for Swedish society) (with Filip Ahlin, Peder Hyllengren, Magnus Normark) (2018) 
 Financial activities linked  to persons from Sweden  and Denmark who joined  terrorist groups in Syria  and Iraq during the period 2013 ‐ 2016: Report commissioned by Finansinspektionen (with Filip Ahlin, Magnus Normark) (2017)
 Swedish Foreign Fighters in Syria and Iraq: An Analysis of open-source intelligence and statistical data (with Linus Gustafsson) (2017)
 Gaza Under Hamas: From Islamic Democracy to Islamist Governance (with Björn Brenner) (2017)

References

External links 
 Recent publications by Ranstorp
 Transcript of Ranstorp's statement to 9-11 Commission
 CATS - Center for Asymmetric Threat Studies at the Swedish National Defence College
  - verified account

1965 births
Living people
Academics of the University of St Andrews
Terrorism theorists
Swedish political scientists
People from Hässleholm Municipality